Elizabeth Horsell (1798 – 1874) was an English vegetarianism and teetotalism activist, and the author of an early vegan cookbook. She was married to the publisher and activist William Horsell, with whom she operated a hydropathic infirmary at Northwood Villa in Ramsgate.

Biography 
Horsell was involved in the temperance movement from the 1840s and was invited to give a lecture at Dr John Lee's 'Peace and Temperance Festival'. She took part in vegetarian meetings in London, along with her husband, and gave frequent lectures both inside London, such as at the Talfourd Hotel, and further afield. Horsell moved with her husband to Ramsgate in 1846, where they intended to establish a "hydropathic boarding house".

After her husband's death, Horsell continued to take part in the vegetarian movement. She also operated an all-female boarding school, with spaces for vegetarian boarders.

Horsell died in 1874.

Publications 
 The Penny Domestic Assistant. Being a Guide to Vegetarian Cookery, without the use of Animal Products or Salt; Hints on Domestic Management, Industry, Frugality, and Cleanliness; accompanied with Nature's Bill of Fare, and valuable Statistical Tables (London: Horsell, 1850)

References 

1798 births
1874 deaths
British vegetarianism activists
English activists
English temperance activists
Hydrotherapists
Lecturers
Vegetarian cookbook writers
Women cookbook writers